Yannick Lebherz (born 13 January 1989) is a German swimmer who won a gold and a silver medal at the 2010 European Short Course Swimming Championships in the 200 m backstroke and 400 m medley events, respectively. He competed in the same disciplines at the 2012 Summer Olympics but failed to reach the finals.

His father, Thomas Lebherz, is a former competitive swimmer.

References

1989 births
Living people
German male swimmers
Olympic swimmers of Germany
Swimmers at the 2012 Summer Olympics
Male medley swimmers
Medalists at the FINA World Swimming Championships (25 m)
Sportspeople from Darmstadt
20th-century German people
21st-century German people